Paul Brincat is an Australian sound engineer. He was nominated for an Academy Award in the category Best Sound for the film The Thin Red Line. He has worked on more than 40 films since 1971. He won an Emmy Award for Outstanding Sound Mixing for his work on the television series Flipper.

Selected filmography
 The Thin Red Line (1998)

References

External links

Year of birth missing (living people)
Living people
Australian audio engineers
Daytime Emmy Award winners